The S9 is a regional railway line of the S-Bahn Zürich on the Zürcher Verkehrsverbund (ZVV), Zürich transportation network, and is one of the network's lines connecting the cantons of Zürich and Schaffhausen in Switzerland. Between the two Swiss cantons, the line also serves two stations in Germany.

Route 
 

The line runs from Schaffhausen, capital of the canton of Schaffhausen to Zurich Hauptbahnhof, before continuing via Zürich Stadelhofen to Uster. The following stations are served:

 Schaffhausen
 Neuhausen
 Neuhausen Rheinfall
 Swiss-German border
 Jestetten (Germany)
 Lottstetten (Germany)
 Swiss-German border
 Rafz
 Hüntwangen-Wil
 Eglisau
 Glattfelden
 Bülach
 
 
 
 
 
 
 Zürich Hauptbahnhof
 Zürich Stadelhofen
 Stettbach
 Dübendorf
 Schwerzenbach
 Nänikon-Greifensee
 Uster

Rolling stock 
 all services are operated by Re 450 class locomotives pushing or pulling double-deck passenger carriages.

Scheduling 
Between Uster and Rafz, trains run every 30 minutes throughout the day. At peak periods all trains continue from Rafz to Schaffhausen, but at other times alternate trains terminate at Rafz. The journey time from Uster to Schaffhausen takes 82 minutes.

History 
Prior to the timetable revision of late 2015, the section of the S9 between Zürich and Uster operated much as today. However west of Zürich, the trains operated to Zug via Affoltern am Albis. The sections of line no longer covered by the S9 are now served by the S5.

See also 

 Rail transport in Switzerland
 Trams in Zürich

References

External links 
 
 ZVV official website: Routes & zones

Zürich S-Bahn lines
Canton of Schaffhausen
Transport in the canton of Zürich